is the name of a country or land that appears in the Book of Sui Dynasty and History of the Northern Dynasties in the history of China as being in the Japan region. or land name that appears in Northern History. It is compared to Tsukushi Province.

Outline 
The country of Chikushikoku appears in "Book of Sui" volume 81, biography 46 "Eastern Barbarians, the country of Buyeo" and "Northern History" volume 94, biography 82. It is mentioned immediately after the passage "The Emperor of the Land where the Sun Rises" in the letter sent by the Buyeo (Wa) envoy, to Emperor Yang of Sui.

Descriptions in the Sui Dynasty and the Northern History 
It describes the route taken by the envoys from the Sui Dynasty. The envoys went from Baekje to Takeshima (not an island that has been disputed by Japan and Korea since the late 20th century), Tsushima to Iki, and then arrived at "Takeshikoku. The area east of there is said to be the territory of Japan. The reason why "Sui Dynasty" refers to "Hye-qing" and "Northern History" refers to "Hye-se-qing" is that "Sui Dynasty" was Naming taboo.

Different theories 
The common theory is that the "其人・・・・・・不能明也" part of the above Chinese historical document is an explanation of the Shin'okoku, but the following theory exists.

 According to Yozaburo Ishihara, it is thought that people from Takeshikoku (Tsukushi Province) were considered to be from the same birthplace as Huaxia.

Bibliography 

  - 和田 石原 1951 の新訂- 注記：石原は、北史は隋書・梁書によっているとのことで、魏志・隋書の脚注において、北史との相違部分を説明している。
 邪馬台国　石原洋三郎　令和元年十月　第一印刷

See also 

 Tsukushi (disambiguation)
 Tsukushi Province
 Shin'okoku

References 

Former countries in Japanese history
History of the Kyushu region
Wajinden
States of the Wajinden
Pages with unreviewed translations